Rašćani may refer to:

 Rašćani, Sveti Ivan Žabno, a village near Sveti Ivan Žabno in Croatia
 Rašćani, Tomislavgrad, a village near Tomislavgrad in Bosnia and Herzegovina